The following highways are numbered 632:

United Kingdom
 A632 road

United States